Pultenaea acerosa, commonly known as bristly bush-pea, is a species of flowering plant in the family Fabaceae and is endemic to south-eastern continental Australia. It is a rigid, much-branched shrub with glabrous, grooved, needle-shaped leaves and yellow flowers with red veins.

Description
The flowers are borne singly in up to ten leaf axils at the ends of the branchlets, and are more or less sessile with bracteoles attached to the base of the sepals. The wings are oblong and the keel is semicircular with a dark red tip.

Taxonomy and naming
Pultenaea acerosa was first formally described in 1864 by George Bentham in Flora Australiensis from an unpublished description by Robert Brown. The specific epithet (acerosa) means "needle-shaped", referring to the leaves.

Distribution
This pultenaea grows in the far south-east of South Australia and in the extreme west of Victoria.

References

acerosa
Flora of South Australia
Flora of Victoria (Australia)
Taxa named by George Bentham
Plants described in 1864